Jeffrey Goldstone (born 3 September 1933) is a British theoretical physicist and an emeritus physics faculty member at the MIT Center for Theoretical Physics.

He worked at the University of Cambridge until 1977. He is famous for the discovery of the Nambu–Goldstone boson. He is currently working on quantum computation.

Biography
Born in Manchester, he was educated at Manchester Grammar School and Trinity College, Cambridge, (B.A. 1954, Ph.D. 1958). He worked on the theory of nuclear matter under the guidance of Hans Bethe and developed modifications of Feynman diagrams for non-relativistic many-fermion systems, which are currently referred to as Goldstone diagrams.

Goldstone was a research fellow of Trinity College, Cambridge, from 1956 to 1960 and held visiting research posts at Copenhagen, CERN and Harvard. During this time, his research focus shifted to particle physics and he investigated the nature of relativistic field theories with spontaneously broken symmetries. With Abdus Salam and Steven Weinberg, he proved that in such theories zero-mass particles (Nambu–Goldstone bosons) must exist.

From 1962 to 1976, Goldstone was a faculty member at Cambridge. In the early 1970s, with Peter Goddard, Claudio Rebbi and Charles Thorn, he worked out the light-cone quantization theory of relativistic strings. He moved to the USA in 1977 as Professor of Physics at MIT, where he has been the Cecil and Ida Green Professor of Physics since 1983 and was Director of the MIT Center for Theoretical Physics from 1983-89.

Goldstone published research on solitons in quantum field theory with Roman Jackiw and Frank Wilczek, and on the quantum strong law of large numbers with Edward Farhi and Samuel Gutmann. Since 1997, he has been working, with Farhi, Gutmann, Michael Sipser and Andrew Childs, on quantum computation algorithms.

Awards and honors
 Fellow of the Royal Society (elected 1977),
 Fellow of the American Academy of Arts and Sciences (1977),
 Fellow of the American Physical Society (1987).
 Honorary Fellow of Trinity College, Cambridge (2000).
 Dannie Heineman Prize of the American Physical Society (1981) "For his contribution to nuclear physics, condensed matter physics and to quantum field theory, in establishing the first rigorous diagrammatic technique for the many-body problem and in proving a fundamental theorem on spontaneously broken global symmetry."
 Guthrie Medal of the Institute of Physics (London) (1983)
 Dirac Medal of the International Center for Theoretical Physics (Trieste).

See also
 Adiabatic quantum computation
 Effective action
 Goldstinos
 Sgoldstino
 Goldstone's theorem
 Quantum approximate optimization algorithm

Notes and references

External links

1933 births
Living people
Scientists from Manchester
People educated at Manchester Grammar School
British physicists
Fellows of the Royal Society
Fellows of the American Physical Society
People associated with CERN
Quantum information scientists
MIT Center for Theoretical Physics faculty